The Madagascar partridge (Margaroperdix madagarensis) is a species of bird in the family Phasianidae. It is widespread across  Madagascar (except extreme south). It has been introduced to Réunion.

Its natural habitats are subtropical or tropical moist lowland forest and subtropical or tropical moist montane forest.

References

Madagascar partridge
Madagascar partridge
Birds of Madagascar
Madagascar partridge
Taxonomy articles created by Polbot